Bob Trainer (15 September 1927 – 14 June 1982) was an  Australian rules footballer who played with South Melbourne in the Victorian Football League (VFL).

Notes

External links 

1927 births
1982 deaths
Australian rules footballers from Victoria (Australia)
Sydney Swans players
Port Melbourne Football Club players
Frankston Football Club players